U. floribunda may refer to:

 Ungeria floribunda, a plant endemic to Norfolk Island
 Unonopsis floribunda, a tree with dark bark